Christopher Otule (born January 4, 1990) is an American-Nigerian professional basketball player for BCM Gravelines of the LNB Pro A. He played college basketball at Marquette University.

Otule played six years at Marquette, four as an opening game starter.  Chris went undrafted in the 2014 NBA draft and after that went on to play professionally overseas, starting in Germany.

References

1990 births
Living people
American expatriate basketball people in China
American expatriate basketball people in France
American expatriate basketball people in Germany
American men's basketball players
Basketball players from Houston
BCM Gravelines players
Centers (basketball)
Crailsheim Merlins players
Marquette Golden Eagles men's basketball players
Mitteldeutscher BC players
Nigerian men's basketball players
Olympique Antibes basketball players
People from Richmond, Texas
SeaHorses Mikawa players
SIG Basket players
Toyotsu Fighting Eagles Nagoya players